Robert Lilligren (born July 2, 1960) is an American politician and member of the Minnesota Democratic-Farmer-Labor Party. He was an elected member of the Minneapolis City Council.  He was first elected in 2001, to represent the 8th Ward of the Minneapolis City Council. Following the defeat of Green Party member Dean Zimmermann, during the 2005 municipal elections, Lilligren represented the 6th Ward of the City of Minneapolis. When first elected to office, Lilligren was serving as a volunteer on eight different community boards and commissions including: vice-chair of Phillips West Neighborhood organization, the Midtown Greenway Coalition (a bike/walk advocacy group), the Hennepin County-appointed I-35W Project Advisory Committee, and as a board member for several affordable housing groups throughout South Minneapolis. He lost his re-election bid in 2013 to Abdi Warsame. He was appointed to the Metropolitan Council by Governor Tim Walz in March 2019.

Personal

Lilligren, as a member of the White Earth Band of Ojibwe, is the first American Indian tribal member to serve on the Minneapolis City Council. In addition, he was one of two openly gay city council members; an avid reader, and a classically trained singer. He does not own a car.

History 

Shortly after Lilligren moved to Minneapolis in 1984, crack arrived in Minneapolis and specifically his neighborhood of Phillips West. [5] Lilligren stayed on his block, purchasing rundown apartment buildings and renovating them with Joe Olson, his business partner. They currently own several buildings in South Minneapolis and still reside in those buildings. 
A key focus of Robert's first term in office was helping to jump start the stalled Sears project – a 2 million square foot vacant and dark building- which is now the up and running Midtown Exchange. His leadership helped to set and exceed historically high minority and women workforce and contractor goals for the project. He drafted language into the project's Request for Proposals (RFP) that allowed for the creation of the Global Market at the Midtown Exchange. This open market brings opportunities for local entrepreneurs – many from new arrival and immigrant communities – and makes fresh food and produce more available to inner-city residents as well as being a regional attraction. Presently, he has shifted his focus to the reopening of Nicollet Avenue at Lake Street, making this revitalizing effort a top priority. The decision by the Minneapolis City Council in the 1970s to close Nicollet Avenue was never a popular one. It was a crisis response to a budget draining situation. The City of Minneapolis’ closing of Nicollet was responsible for dividing our communities and taking redevelopment momentum from this important intersection. The 6th Ward is at the center of a lot of major, long-term transportation and energy projects going on in the City of Minneapolis. These public and public-purpose proposals will bring significant investment in the Ward and throughout Minneapolis. 6th Ward residents, business owners, workers and other stakeholders will need to be involved in these efforts to ensure that the public investment reflects the communities’ interests. Some other on- going projects include:

1.	35W/Lake Street Transit/Access Project
The intersection of 35W and Lake Street is once again the site of intense design efforts. For decades almost all levels of government have been interested in further investment in the 35W and Lake Street area, though there has been disagreement about the scope and nature of the work. This time around the City of Minneapolis, Hennepin County, Metropolitan Council/Metro Transit and MN Dept. of Transportation (MnDOT) have joined efforts in a planning process that puts transit first. This means building a new bridge and creating a connection to the Midtown Greenway where streetcars will be installed.

2.	Xcel Hiawatha High Voltage Power Line
In addition, for the last several years Xcel Energy has sought to build a high voltage power line along the Midtown Greenway corridor from Hiawatha Avenue to 35W with substations at Hiawatha and at Oakland Ave at the Greenway. Xcel is currently working with community representatives to design the two substations. These large-scale, long-term projects along with continued investment in alternative energy generation, onsite energy storage, energy conservation, and the pedestrian and biking realms will continue to better serve all of the Midtown area, South Minneapolis, to provide greater options, improve the environment, promote energy independence and keep housing affordable.

Notable work
Midtown Exchange
I-35W Access Project
ShotSpotter gunfire locator funding in Minneapolis

Appointments

City Council Committee Positions
Committee of the Whole - Chair
Executive Committee - Member
Community Development - Member
Transportation and Public Works - Member (Former Vice Chair)
Information Services Policy Steer Group - Member (Founding Chair)
Minneapolis Community Development Agency – Secretary
Rules and Taxes Committees - Member

Other Council Appointments
Transportation Advisory Board (TAB) – Member/Chair Programming Committee
Northern Lights Express (Duluth to Minneapolis passenger rail) Alliance - Minneapolis representative
Transit Improvement Board Advisory Committee (GEARS) - Minneapolis representative
I-35W Solutions Alliance – Vice Chair
Bike/Walk Twin Cities Advisory Council to Transit for Livable Communities
Met Council Transportation Committee (TAB representative) - Non-voting member
Meet Minneapolis Convention and Visitors Association Board – Executive Committee
Neighborhood Revitalization Program Policy Board - Alternate
Citywide Labor Management Committee - Member
Midtown Community Works Partnership Executive Committee - Member
Minneapolis Bioscience Corridor Governance Board – Member
Minneapolis Rail Policy Group – Member
Southwest Corridor LRT Policy Advisory Committee - Minneapolis representative (completed 2010)
Minneapolis Metropolitan Council Workgroup – Member (completed 2011)
Civilian Review Authority Redesign Committee - Chair (completed 2007)
Neighborhood Revitalization Program Workgroup – Chair (completed 2010)
Minneapolis Empowerment Zone Governance Board - Member (completed 2010)

Other Community Work
Native American Community Development Institute Founding Board Chair
Women's Environmental Institute Board Member
OutFront MN Board Member
Bikeon(.org,) Founding Board Member
Inter-Tribal Elder Services Ex-Officio Board Member
Minneapolis Crisis Nursery Capital Campaign Committee (completed)
Minneapolis American Indian Center Capital Campaign Committee (completed)
LSS Center for Changing Lives Capital Campaign Committee (completed)

References

External links
Robert Lilligren's City Council Webpage
Robert Lilligren's Campaign Website

Living people
1960 births
Ojibwe people
Minneapolis City Council members
Minnesota Democrats
Gay politicians
American LGBT city council members
LGBT Native Americans
LGBT people from Minnesota
Native American city councillors
White Earth Band of Ojibwe